The Golia Monastery is a Romanian Orthodox monastery located in Iaşi, Romania. The monastery is listed in the National Register of Historic Monuments. In 2012, the conservation of the Monastery was awarded the European Union Prize for Cultural Heritage / Europa Nostra Award.

History

Located in the middle of the old Moldavian capital and raised on the foundation of the church erected, in the 16th century, by the boyar Ioan Golia, the monastery was rebuilt on a greater scale by Prince Vasile Lupu, between 1650 and 1653, and completed by his son Ştefăniţă. 

The monastery is surrounded by tall walls, with corner turrets and a  height tower with 120 steps, one of city’s symbols, and houses the Ion Creangă Museum (the writer was curate of the church) and Doxologia Cultural Missionary Centre of the Metropolis of Moldavia and Bukovina.

References

External links

 Churches and monasteries in Iaşi at Iași City Hall website

Romanian Orthodox churches in Iași
Romanian Orthodox monasteries of Iași County
Christian monasteries established in the 17th century
Historic monuments in Iași County